The Expedition to Kamaran in 1523 was an Ottoman expedition opposing the occupation of the Kamaran Island by the Portuguese. The Portuguese forces were destroyed and expelled from the Island by Selman Reis and Husayn al Rumi.

In 1523 Selman Reis went on an expedition in the Red Sea. During this expedition Selman Reis discovered that the Kamaran Island was occupied recently by the Portuguese,The Portuguese used their base to raid the coast of Arabia, Salman Reis and Husayn al Rumi had an Ottoman force composed of 4,000 men. After their arrival in Yemen, the Ottomans attacked the Portuguese which resulted in the complete destruction and expulsion of Portuguese forces and the occupation of the island by the Ottomans.

References

Battles involving the Ottoman Empire
16th-century conflicts
16th century in the Portuguese Empire
Wars involving Portugal
Ottoman period in Yemen
Battles involving Yemen
Battles of the Ottoman–Portuguese conflicts